In physical chemistry, the Faraday constant, denoted by the symbol  and sometimes stylized as ℱ, is the electric charge per mole of elementary charges. It is named after the English scientist Michael Faraday. Since the 2019 redefinition of SI base units, which took effect on 20 May 2019, the Faraday constant has the exactly defined value given by the product of the elementary charge e and Avogadro constant NA:

.

Derivation 
The Faraday constant can be thought of as the conversion factor between the mole (used in chemistry) and the coulomb (used in physics and in practical electrical measurements), and is therefore of particular use in electrochemistry. Because 1 mole contains exactly  entities, and 1 coulomb contains exactly  elementary charges, the Faraday constant is given by the quotient of these two quantities:
.

One common use of the Faraday constant is in electrolysis calculations. One can divide the amount of charge (the current integrated over time) by the Faraday constant in order to find the chemical amount of a substance (in moles) that has been electrolyzed.

Other common units
 96.485 kJ per volt–gram-equivalent
 23.061 kcal per volt–gram-equivalent
 26.801 A·h/mol

Faraday – a unit of charge

Related to the Faraday constant is the "faraday", a unit of electrical charge. It is much less common than the coulomb, but is sometimes used in electrochemistry. One faraday of charge is the magnitude of the charge of one mole of electrons, i.e.,
1 faraday = F × 1 mol = 

Conversely, the Faraday constant F equals 1 faraday per mole.

The faraday is not to be confused with the farad, an unrelated unit of capacitance.

Popular media
The Simpsons episode "Dark Knight Court" has Mr. Burns asking Comic Book Guy how much he wants for his entire comic book inventory.  He says "the speed of light expressed as dollars" and Mr. Burns tells Smithers to "just give him Faraday's Constant".  The check is written for $96,485.34.

See also
 Faraday cage
 Faraday efficiency
 Faraday's laws of electrolysis
 Faraday's law of induction
 Faraday cup

References

Electrochemical concepts
Physical constants
Michael Faraday
Units of electrical charge
Units of amount of substance